East Buckhead is a term sometimes used in the Atlanta area for what is now the westernmost part of the city of Brookhaven, Georgia. This includes areas bordering Buckhead on the east including parts of the Buford Highway corridor closest to the DeKalb County/Fulton County line, Lenox Park (DeKalb County, Georgia) and the area in between.

References

Geography of DeKalb County, Georgia